Claveria, officially the Municipality of Claveria,  is a 3rd class municipality in the province of Masbate, Philippines. According to the 2020 census, it has a population of 42,142 people. Ranked 592nd among 1,488 municipalities in the Philippines.

It is located on the southern portion Burias Island, southeast of the nation's capital of Manila.

Etymology

The municipality was named after the Spanish governor-general Narciso Clavería y Zaldúa, who in 1844 anchored at Punduhan Paloha, the present site of Recodo (Poblacion District II), while in pursuit of Moro pirates, and named the place after himself.

History
Bicolanos from Albay, Sorsogon and nearby provinces and Tagalogs from the Bondoc Peninsula are considered as the first settlers of Burias Island. Their original settlement, called Matandang Nayon ("Old Village"), was founded near the bank of the Siargao River.

In the 19th century, when the Spaniards were fighting the Moros in many parts of Mindanao, Burias Island became a refuge for retreating Moros due to its relatively isolated location and deep safe harbors. After Governor General Claveria's visit, it became the first sitio called “Visita”, a spanished term for visit.

In 1898 during the Philippine Revolution, Barrio Visita became a town and officially adopted the name Claveria, with Arcadio Sabaulan as Presidente Municipal. The first Justice of the Peace was Estanislao Abetria and the first priest was Padre Rebeya.

Three years later, in 1901, a cholera epidemic severely affected the municipality, resulting in a large population decrease. Consequently, the municipality was reverted to a barrio by virtue of a Municipal Council resolution, with Marcelo del Rosario as appointed Cabesa de Barangay.

In the middle of the 20th century, residents of Claveria began the initiative to reestablish Claveria into a municipality, especially spearheaded by Eleuterio C. Ombao, then head teacher of Claveria Elementary School. Despite strong opposition from the Municipality Council of San Pascual, Bill RA 2187 creating Claveria into a municipality was approved in the House of Representatives on May 7, 1959. September 5, 1959, was inauguration day, and Councilor Alfredo Alim was appointed Municipal mayor, also winning this position during the first local election in November of that year.

Barangays

Claveria is politically subdivided into 22 barangays.

Climate

Demographics

Econo

References

External links
 [ Philippine Standard Geographic Code]
Philippine Census Information
Local Governance Performance Management System

Municipalities of Masbate